Misago Nelly Wilson  (born 14 December 1985), sometimes as Misago Wilson, is a Rwandan film producer, He is the Chief executive Officer (CEO) of Zacu Entertainment, a production and distribution house in Rwanda. He is best known as the writer of critically acclaimed television drama serials such as Inshuti (Friends, Seburikoko and City Maid, Indoto. He is also a content creator, writer and producer works in both film and television. He also a creator and producer of the drama series "Ejo Si Kera" in cooperation with Imbuto foundation which airs on the of Rwanda television (RTV)

Personal life
Misago Wilson was born in Gisagara district, Rwanda. In 2009, he obtained a degree in finance from School of Finance and Banking, (currently known as University of Rwanda’s College of Business and Economics: UR-CBE).

In 2013 he married his longtime partner, Hilarie Uwabimfura. The wedding ceremony took place at Remera-Kigali. He is a father of two sons In January 2014 his 1st son was born and the second in Feb 2018.

Misago Wilson is very passionate about film production and creativity. He like music and watching movies especially TV series in free time. He likes to travel as hobby and making new friends.

Career
Wilson Misago in 2009 joined Inyarwanda as a journalist. In 2010, he became the marketing manager of Inyarwanda Limited, where he was later promoted to the post of Managing director. In 2012, he worked as a radio presenter at City Radio and create entertainment and  story on Inyarwanda.com. In 2013, he created the serial Ubu n’ejo which was not become popular. However, in 2014, Misago created the television sitcom Inshuti which aired on TV10. The series is considered as the first ever TV series to be produced locally. With its success, he created a soap  Seburikoko which became one of the most popular television dramas in Rwanda. The series aired on Rwanda Television.  

Then in late 2014, he created and produced City Maid, another urban series aired on RTV. It also highly popularized among the public. In 2017, wrote and directed the short Little Skater. Later in the year, he founded  the audiovisual company 'Afrifame Limited', which deals with television content production and photography services.

He is founder of the Zacu TV, the first Rwandan subscription video on demand (VOD) platform broadcasting Rwandan films and series. It was officially unveiled at the Transform Africa Summit 2019.

Mid-year 2022, Zacu TV was acquired by Canal+ Group with the intention of strengthening audio-visual production in Rwanda; enriching the local content market; and reflecting the creativity and talents of different generations of actors, actresses, directors, and other artists.  Zacu TV is now available on Canal+ decoders through Ikaze subscription on channel 99.

Filmography

References

External links
 
 Rwandans are starring in a 36-episode film

Living people
Rwandan film producers
1985 births